Ardjoune is a surname. Notable people with the surname include:

 Abdellah Ardjoune (born 2001), Algerian swimmer
 Fatima Zohra Ardjoune, Algerian Army general